The Isaac Watson House is the headquarters of the New Jersey State Society of the National Society of the Daughters of the American Revolution (DAR). It is located just outside the state capital of Trenton in Hamilton Township, Mercer County, New Jersey. It is situated on a bluff overlooking Watson's Creek and the Abbott Farm National Historic Landmark in John A. Roebling Park, a 257-acre nature preserve.

Built by Isaac Watson in 1708, the stone house  is recognized as the oldest house in Mercer County. Originally 800 acres, the grounds at one time ran from the bluff to the Delaware River.

The building was restored by the DAR as part of the New Jersey Tercentenary Celebration in 1964 and listed on the New Jersey Register of Historic Places in 1972 and the National Register of Historic Places on January 21, 1974.

Gallery

See also
List of the oldest buildings in New Jersey
National Register of Historic Places listings in Mercer County, New Jersey

References

External links
 
 NJDAR State Headquarters — Isaac Watson House 
 
 

Hamilton Township, Mercer County, New Jersey
Watson, Isaac House
Watson, Isaac House
Watson, Isaac House
Historic house museums in New Jersey
Daughters of the American Revolution museums
Museums in Mercer County, New Jersey
Watson, Isaac House
Watson, Isaac House
New Jersey Register of Historic Places
1708 establishments in New Jersey